Solar X-Ray Spectrometer, or SOXS, was an experimental payload launched onboard Indian geostationary satellite GSAT-2 by the Indian Space Research Organisation, ISRO. SOXS collected data about X-ray emissions from solar flares with high energy and temporal resolutions.

Features
 X-Ray Spectrometer (SOXS) was flown onboard GSAT-2 on 8-May-2003.
 SOXS employs Si and CZT semiconductor devices, which are extremely high resolution and low noise detectors.
 Detector package is mounted on a Sun Pointing Mechanism with tracking accuracy better than 0.1 degree.
 Pulse Height (PHA) measurements in 256 channels.
 System Dead Time- 16 microseconds for Si Pin and 13 microseconds for CZT.
 Energy window counters.
 On board calibration using Cd109 Radio isotope.
 System Health Parameters Monitoring.
 Onboard selection for Background Rejection (LLD/Threshold).
 In view of Temperature sensitivity of the detectors, observational interval is < 3 Hrs starting from 04:00 to 06:45 UT.
Block Schematics of SLD Payload (SLED, SFE, SLE and SCE)
SSTM Daily Tracking (0 to 189 degrees)

References

Astronomical spectroscopy